The 1802 English cricket season was the 31st in which matches have been awarded retrospective first-class cricket status and the 16th after the foundation of the Marylebone Cricket Club. The season saw three top-class matches played in the country.

Matches 
Three top-class matches were played during the season, two of them staged at Lord's Old Ground and one at Aram's New Ground in Walworth. In one match an England XI played a Surrey side. The other matches were played between sides assembled by patrons.

Debutants
Players known to have made their first-class debut during the season include:
 Abbott
 William Hall Gage

References

Further reading
 Altham HS (1962) A History of Cricket, Volume 1 London: George Allen & Unwin.
 Birley D (1999)  A Social History of English Cricket. London: Aurum. 
 Major J (2007) More Than a Game: The Story of Cricket's Early Years. London: HarperCollins. 

1802 in English cricket
English cricket seasons in the 19th century